Mozena lunata is a species of leaf-footed bug in the family Coreidae. It is found in Central America and North America.

Subspecies
These two subspecies belong to the species Mozena lunata:
 Mozena lunata lunata (Burmeister, 1835)
 Mozena lunata rufescens Ruckes, 1955

References

Further reading

 

Articles created by Qbugbot
Insects described in 1835
Nematopodini